Peter Nicolas Cunningham  (1816–1869) was a British writer born in London, son of the Scottish author Allan Cunningham and his wife Jean (née Walker, 1791–1866). Cunningham published several topographical and biographical studies, of which the most important are his Handbook of London (1849) and The Life of Drummond of Hawthornden (1833). He edited Extracts from the Accounts of the Revels at Court in the Reigns of Elizabeth and James I (1842) and Horace Walpole's Letters (1857).

In 1851 he appeared in an amateur production of a play Not So Bad As We Seem by Edward Bulwer-Lytton along with Charles Dickens, Wilkie Collins, Mark Lemon, John Tenniel, Douglas Jerrold and others.

Family
Cunningham married Zenobia Martin (1816–1901). They had three children Edith, Norah, and Walter Cunningham (1850–1936).

Notes

References

External links 
 
 
 

19th-century British writers
1816 births
1869 deaths
Fellows of the Society of Antiquaries of London
English male non-fiction writers
19th-century English male writers